The 2000 European Tour was the 29th official season of golf tournaments known as the PGA European Tour.

The season was made up of 44 tournaments counting towards the Order of Merit, which included the four major championships and three World Golf Championships, and several non-counting "Approved Special Events".

The Order of Merit was won by England's Lee Westwood who won six times during the season to end Colin Montgomerie's seven-year reign as Europe's number one.

Changes for 2000
There were several changes from the previous season, with the Alfred Dunhill Championship replacing the South African PGA Championship due to sponsorship reasons, the addition of two tournaments celebrating the 500th anniversary of the discovery of Brazil by Pedro Álvares Cabral in 1500, the Greg Norman Holden International, the Celtic Manor Resort Wales Open and The Eurobet Seve Ballesteros Trophy, and the loss of the Estoril Open, the German Open and the Sarazen World Open. Money earned from the Masters Tournament counted towards the Order of Merit for the first time.

Schedule
The following table lists official events during the 2000 season.

Unofficial events
The following events were sanctioned by the European Tour, but did not carry official money, nor were wins official.

Order of Merit
The Order of Merit was titled as the Volvo Order of Merit and was based on prize money won during the season, calculated in Euros.

Awards

See also
List of golfers with most European Tour wins

Notes

References

External links
2000 season results on the PGA European Tour website
2000 Order of Merit on the PGA European Tour website

European Tour seasons
European Tour